Vern Sheridan Poythress (born 1946) is an American philosopher, theologian, New Testament scholar and mathematician, who is currently the New Testament chair of the ESV Oversight Committee. He is also the Professor of New Testament Interpretation at Westminster Theological Seminary and editor of Westminster Theological Journal.

Biography
Poythress was born in Madera, California in 1946 to Ransom H. Poythress and Carola N. Poythress.  He graduated from Bullard High School in Fresno, California.

At the age of 20, Poythress earned a B.S. in mathematics  with honor (valedictorian) from California Institute of Technology, in the year 1966. While there, he became a Putnam Fellow in 1964. He received his Ph.D. in mathematics from Harvard University, finishing in 1970. Westminster Theological Seminary awarded him both an M.Div and  a Th.M in apologetics for work done in the years 1971-74. He earned an M.Litt from the University of Cambridge in New Testament studies during 1974-76. He received a Th.D. in New Testament from the University of Stellenbosch.

In 1983, Poythress married Diane M. Poythress.  They have two sons, Ransom Poythress and Justin Poythress.

As of 2016, he was teaching New Testament and occasional courses on the philosophies of science and language at Westminster Theological Seminary in Philadelphia, work he began in 1976. His blog with John M. Frame was listed in early 2018 as one of the top 50 Christian popular culture sites.

Thought
Poythress views scientific law as a form of the word of God. In 1976, Poythress wrote a chapter on "A Biblical View of Mathematics," in which he argued (among other things) that number is eternal because the Trinity is eternal. In a 1983 article, he suggested that mathematics is the rhyme of the universe. His philosophy of science draws on the work of Thomas Kuhn.

Publications
Poythress has published a number of books in different fields — Christian philosophy of science, linguistics, theological method, dispensationalism, biblical law, copyright law, hermeneutics, Bible translation, and eschatology and the Book of Revelation including:

 Philosophy, Science, and the Sovereignty of God. Presbyterian and Reformed: 1976, reprinted 2004. .
 Symphonic Theology: The Validity of Multiple Perspectives in Theology. Zondervan: 1987. .
  Understanding Dispensationalists. 2d ed. Presbyterian and Reformed: 1993. .
 Science and Hermeneutics: Implications of Scientific Method for Biblical Interpretation (Foundations of Contemporary Interpretation series, volume 6). Zondervan: 1988. .
 The Shadow of Christ in the Law of Moses, Wolgemuth & Hyatt: 1991, reprinted Presbyterian & Reformed: 1995. .
 God-Centered Biblical Interpretation. Presbyterian and Reformed: 1999. .
 The Returning King: A Guide to the Book of Revelation, Presbyterian and Reformed: 2000. .
 The Gender-Neutral Bible Controversy: Muting the Masculinity of Gods Words (with Wayne Grudem). Broadman and Holman: 2000. .
 The TNIV and The Gender-Neutral Bible Controversy (with Wayne Grudem). Broadman and Holman: 2004. .
 Redeeming Science: A God-Centered Approach. Crossway Books: 2006. .
 In The Beginning Was The Word: Language--A God-Centered Approach. Crossway Books: 2009. .
 What Are Spiritual Gifts? (Basics of the Faith series). Presbyterian and Reformed, 2010. .
 Redeeming Sociology: A God-Centered Approach. Crossway Books: 2011. .
 Inerrancy and Worldview: Answering Modern Challenges to the Bible. Crossway Books: 2012. .
 Inerrancy and the Gospels: A God-Centered Approach to the Challenges of Harmonization. Crossway Books: 2012. .
 Logic: A God-Centered Approach to the Foundation of Western Thought. Crossway Books: 2013. .
 Redeeming Mathematics: A God-Centered Approach. Crossway Books: 2015. .

Additionally, he has published a number of scholarly articles, including:

References

Further reading
  A Festschrift dedicated to Poythress, with contributions from J. I. Packer, Brandon Crowe, Iain M. Duguid, Richard B. Gaffin Jr., Peter Lillback, Carl R. Trueman, Camden Bucey, Robert Cara, In Whan Kim, Lane Tipton, Pierce Taylor Hibbs, Jeff Waddington, Luke Lu, Brian Wood, and others.
 Faculty page of the title subject, at Westminster Theological Seminary, by the title subject.
 Resume of the article subject, by the article subject.
  [Interview with title subject, after publication of Chance and the Sovereignty of God.]

External links
 Frame-Poythress.org, a website that publishes books, articles, and audio by the title subject, and by theologian John Frame.

Living people
1946 births
Presbyterian Church in America ministers
Protestant philosophers
American Calvinist and Reformed theologians
Calvinist and Reformed philosophers
California Institute of Technology alumni
Harvard University alumni
Westminster Theological Seminary alumni
Westminster Theological Seminary faculty
Putnam Fellows
Alumni of Clare College, Cambridge
Academic journal editors
Stellenbosch University alumni
California State University, Fresno faculty
People from Madera, California
20th-century American writers
21st-century American non-fiction writers
20th-century Calvinist and Reformed theologians
21st-century Calvinist and Reformed theologians
20th-century American philosophers
21st-century American philosophers
New Testament scholars
American biblical scholars
Editors of Christian publications
Critics of atheism
Writers about religion and science